Hate Crew Deathroll is the fourth studio album by the Finnish melodic death metal band Children of Bodom, released in 2003 under the Century Media label. And this is also the final Children of Bodom album to be recorded with all five original members as their original rhythm guitarist Alexander Kuoppala, would leave the band in 2003. It was successful both in Europe and the USA, which is demonstrated by the appearance of the "Needled 24/7" music video on MTV2's Headbangers Ball. "Needled 24/7" also featured on the heavy metal documentary Metal: A Headbanger's Journey and the 2012 horror comedy video game Lollipop Chainsaw.

The track "Angels Don't Kill" was included on the soundtrack of the 2009 video game Brütal Legend and the track "Hate Crew Deathroll" was included in the 2007 skateboarding video game Skate.

Name
Alexi Laiho had the letters COBHC (Children of Bodom Hate Crew) tattooed on his left hand fingers.

Tracks
With this album, the band's sound became more condensed and less classical influenced, oriented more towards thrash metal and a harsher sound than previous albums.  The keyboards were toned down as the guitars took hold as the more predominant instrument.

The tracks "Sixpounder" and "Angels Don't Kill" are played in drop C (CGCFAD) tuning, which has the 6th (C) string tuned a step lower than the band's usual step-down tuning.

The band shot a video for "Needled 24/7", but it ended up being very expensive and did not turn out the way how they wanted. To make up for it, they shot the video for "Sixpounder". This video has an edited version, in which the blood looks less realistic, and the license plate at the beginning just says "COB 6 6". At the end of "Needled 24/7", there is a quote: "Death? What do y'all know about death?" taken from the movie Platoon. The lyrics of "Sixpounder" are about sixpounder cannons.

"You're Better Off Dead" was the only single from the CD. The single also contained a cover of the Ramones' "Somebody Put Something in My Drink". It topped the Finnish singles chart and stayed in the top 20 for sixteen weeks.

"Bodom Beach Terror" includes a quote heard in the movie American Psycho: "My pain is constant and sharp and I do not hope for a better world for anyone, in fact I want my pain to be inflicted on others." The quote can be heard at the end of the song. It continues at the beginning of the next track, "Angels Don't Kill", with "I want no one to escape."

For the song "Needled 24/7" Alexi Laiho was dubbed in the top 50 for fastest guitarist of all time.

The booklet contains the lyrics for "Needled 24/7", "Chokehold (Cocked 'n' Loaded)", "You're Better Off Dead" and "Hate Crew Deathroll".

The song "Hate Crew Deathroll" is only 3:36, but in earlier pressings, there is a hidden track lasting 3 minutes and 2 seconds where, if heard at a high volume, the band are having a lively conversation in their native tongue of Finnish.

Production
After experimenting with a new producer, Peter Tägtgren on Follow the Reaper, the band turned back to their old producer, Anssi Kippo, with Hate Crew Deathroll. The album was mixed by Mikko Karmila, who had also mixed Hatebreeder and the second mix of Follow the Reaper and would later produce their next album, Are You Dead Yet?.

At this time, Children of Bodom were dealing with the issue that their contract with Spinefarm, which published their three earlier major albums, expired with Hate Crew Deathroll'''s predecessor, Follow the Reaper. Furthermore, Spinefarm had been bought by the big company Universal Music Group in 2002, forcing the band to decide whether they would continue with Spinefarm, which would mean that their future albums would be released worldwide by UMG. They received several offers from various companies before their final decision to stay with Spinefarm (and thus UMG).

The contract with the "new" Spinefarm meant that Children of Bodom now had financial backing from one of the world's largest record companies, UMG. This led to the band for the recording of Hate Crew Deathroll having access to production equipment of the highest quality, and as a result, the album also received praise for its production, having been described as "crystal clear" and "sharp".

Reception

Upon its release, Hate Crew Deathroll directly hit first place on the Finnish album charts, where it remained for 2 weeks and then slowly moved down the list, until the smoke out in March 2003 after 9 weeks. In France, the album reached 74th place and stayed on the charts for 2 weeks. In Sweden, it was on 36th place after 2 weeks.

In Germany, the album started at 45th place, but quickly fell to 68th and then to 92nd place before finally falling out of the list. After the release of Hate Crew Deathroll, the band experienced a growing interest from several leading mainstream media, such as MTV, where the video for the song "Needled 24/7" aired on Headbangers Ball.

AllMusic has designated Hate Crew Deathroll'' as Children of Bodom's best-ever album, describing it as an album that is "particularly worth listening to". Conversely, many incarnate fans criticized the album and called it worse than its predecessors. Some of the criticism was directed towards its curious song titles, which have been called rogue. Laiho has responded by saying that they are merely black humor, and that he cannot understand people who take music too seriously.

Generally, it is considered to be more mainstream-oriented than the rest of Children of Bodom's works, which may be due to the close cooperation with the UMG.

As of November 2008, the album has sold 23,566 copies in Finland, and was certified gold the same year as it was released.

Track listing

Personnel

Children of Bodom
Alexi Laiho – lead guitar, vocals
Alexander Kuoppala – rhythm guitar
Henkka Seppälä – bass
Janne Wirman – keyboards
Jaska Raatikainen – drums

Production
Produced and recorded by Anssi Kippo
Mixed by Mikko Karmila
Mastered by Mika "Count" Jussila
Graphic design by Sami Saramäki
Band photographs by Toni Härkönen

Charts

References

2003 albums
Children of Bodom albums
Century Media Records albums
Spinefarm Records albums